Plotava is a rural locality (a selo) and the administrative center of Plotavsky Selsoviet, Aleysky District, Altai Krai, Russia. The population was 469 as of 2013. There are 14 streets.

Geography 
Plotava is located on the Plotavka River, 29 km south of Aleysk (the district's administrative centre) by road. Sovkhozny is the nearest rural locality.

References 

Rural localities in Aleysky District